The 1898–99 season was Stoke's tenth season in the Football League.

With automatic promotion and relegation now introduced thanks to Stoke and Burnley's antics last season, Stoke improved marginally as they took 12th place with 33 points. Stoke form was erratic throughout the season and with neither any hopes of mounting a title challenge or any relegation fears Stoke went on to enjoy their best performance so far in the FA Cup. They reached the semi-final of the competition for the first time losing 3–1 to eventual runners-up Derby County.

Season review

League
The 1898–99 season saw the introduction of automatic promotion and relegation between the First and Second Divisions of the Football League, and Stoke's fortunes improved marginally as they finished in 12th position. The season hardly started well when three players were suspended for a breach of club rules during pre-season training for drinking champagne. In August 1898 club secretary, former manager and goalkeeper Bill Rowley transferred himself to Leicester Fosse and even agreed his own signing on fee. This transaction caused uproar by the FA who suspended Rowley.

Stoke's form-rate in 1898–99 was erratic with only three wins coming in their opening 12 matches, five in the middle 12 and five in the last 10. The highlight was undoubtedly a convincing 3–0 victory over champions-to-be Aston Villa on New Year's Eve, while Burnley and Sheffield United were both beaten 4–1. At the end of the season club legend Joe Schofield decided to retire from playing after spending eight years with Stoke.

FA Cup
Stoke reached the semi-finals of the competition for the first time after seeing off Sheffield Wednesday, Small Heath and Tottenham Hotspur. They succumbed to a 3–1 defeat to Derby County at neutral Molineux with Steve Bloomer scoring a fine hat-trick for the "Rams".

The Evening Sentinel commented: "Derby had their halves to thank for victory, Stoke were decidedly the better side in the first half and it was Derby's luck to get on level terms by means of a scrimmage which was produced by full-back Tom Robertson's miss kick. Stoke did most of the attacking again in the second half until Derby got the lead in an unexpected manner. Of course this put new life into Derby and very little seemed to go wrong with them afterwards although Stoke played up strongly. The weakness in their attack was the centre-forward Fred Molyneux. The Derby players were very vigorous and did not spare the Stoke team in bumping them about. Derby scored a third goal to put the contest beyond the brave Stoke players much to the disappointment of the Stoke spectators."

The Stoke players received a £5 bonus for their cup exploits and it would be another 72 years before the club reached the semi-final stage again.

Final league table

Results
Stoke's score comes first

Legend

Football League First Division

FA Cup

Squad statistics

References

Stoke City F.C. seasons
Stoke